Ladislav Šmíd (born 24 May 1938) is a Czech ice hockey player. He competed in the men's tournament at the 1964 Winter Olympics, winning the bronze medal.

References

External links
 

1938 births
Living people
Czech ice hockey defencemen
Olympic ice hockey players of Czechoslovakia
Ice hockey players at the 1964 Winter Olympics
People from Rožmitál pod Třemšínem
Medalists at the 1964 Winter Olympics
Olympic bronze medalists for Czechoslovakia
Olympic medalists in ice hockey
Sportspeople from the Central Bohemian Region
Czechoslovak ice hockey defencemen